Kikash (Quechua, Hispanicized spelling Quicash) or Pampash (in the local Quechua variant, pampa means "large plain") is a mountain in the Wallanka mountain range in the Andes of Peru, about ) high. It is located in the Ancash Region, Bolognesi Province, Aquia District. It is situated southwest of the main range in a small subrange called Waman Wiqi (Quechua waman falcon or variable hawk, wiqi tear, "falcon tear" or "hawk tear", Hispanicized Huaman Hueque, Huamán Hueque, Huamanhuequi). There is a small lake named Waman Wiqi southeast of Kikash. The stream Pampash originates on the west side of the mountain, flowing west to the Patiwillka River.

Images

Sources 

Mountains of Peru
Mountains of Ancash Region